Sequence is a 2013 short fantasy horror film written and directed by Carles Torrens and starring Joe Hursley, Emma Fitzpatrick, and Ronnie Gene Blevins. The film premiered September 6, 2013, at the Los Angeles International Short Film Festival.

Plot
Billy (Joe Hursley) wakes up one morning only to discover that everyone else in the world had a disturbing nightmare about him the night before. He finds a suspicious note on his car simply saying "You're it" and each person he meets has fearful, strange, or hostile reactions to seeing him in person after their dreams. Billy is unable to find anyone willing tell him the contents of their dream. After a bitter attack by another, Billy wakes with a start in his own bed and realizes that the day's events were themselves a nightmare of his own, itself shared by everyone else in the world. But the sequence continues.

Main cast

 Joe Hursley as Billy
 Emma Fitzpatrick as Amy
 Ronnie Gene Blevins as Robber
 Ruben Garfias as Hector
 Jayne Taini as Mrs. Dunbrow
 Meng as Kang
 Frank Alvarez as Jorge
 Richard Chagoury as Denish
 Mel Fair as Anchorman
 Marcus Dunstan as Angry Man
 Ryan King as Sign Spinner
 Richard Elfman as Homeless Guy
 Joe McDougall as Mailman
 Bonnie Forbes as Puking Lady
 Diana Lado as Waitress
 Leslie Ranne as Waitress
 Aesop Aquarian as Bishop O'Shea

Recognition

Reception
Variety reported that Sequence "was one of the most-applauded films at October's Sitges", and Twitch Film called the film a "major hit" and a "twisted thriller".

Partial awards and nominations
 2013, Won Grand Jury Prize for 'Best Direction' at 24FPS International Short Film Festival for Carles Torrens
 2013, Won 'Best Actor' at 24FPS International Short Film Festival for Joe Hursley
 2013, Won 'Best of the Fest Award' at LA Shorts Fest
 2013, Nominated for Canadian Cinema Editors Award for 'Best Editing in Short Film' for Andrew Coutts
 2013, Nominated for Maria Award for Best Short Film at Sitges - Catalan International Film Festival 
 2013, Nominated for 'Short Grand Prix' at Warsaw International Film Festival 
 2014, Won International Competition Canal+ Award at Clermont-Ferrand International Short Film Festival
 2014, Won 'Emerging Cinematographer Award' by International Cinematographers Guild for Kyle Klutz
 2014, Won Faro de Plata at Festival de Cine de L'Alfàs del Pi
 2014, Won 'Best Soundtrack' at Semana de Cine de Medina del Campo
 2014, nominated for Gaudí Award for "Best Short Film" by the Catalan Film Academy 
 2014, nominated for Deadline Award at Landshut Short Film Festival 
 2014, nominated for Silver Biznaga 'Short Films: Special Jury Award' at Málaga Spanish Film Festival
 2014, Nominated for 'Best Narrative Short' at Tribeca Film Festival

References

External links
 Sequence at the Internet Movie Database

2013 films
2013 independent films
2013 psychological thriller films
Films about nightmares
American short films
American psychological thriller films
Films scored by Zacarías M. de la Riva
2010s English-language films
2010s American films